Bond Street is a London Underground and Elizabeth line station in Mayfair, in the West End of London. Entrances are on Oxford Street, near its junction with New Bond Street, and on Hanover Square.

It is in Travelcard Zone 1.

History

The station was first opened on 24 September 1900 by the Central London Railway, three months after the first stations on the Central line opened. The surface building was designed, in common with all original CLR stations, by the architect Harry Bell Measures. The original plans for the railway named the station as Davies Street rather than Bond Street.

In 1920 a possible joint venture was considered by London Underground and the nearby Selfridges store. This would have involved rebuilding the station, to include an entrance in Selfridge's basement. The idea was revisited in the early 1930s, leading to a concept of a subway connecting the station to the store, with a new ticket office in the basement of Selfridge's. However, these plans were not pursued, probably due to the cost of the construction.

The station has had several major reconstructions. The first, which saw the original lifts replaced by escalators, and the addition of a new sub-surface ticket hall and new station façade, designed by the architect Charles Holden, came into use on 8 June 1926. The tiling to the new ticket hall used the same tiling scheme used by Holden on other station projects at the time (notably the extension of the City and South London Railway to Morden).

Jubilee line era
For the opening of the Jubilee line, the station ticket hall was extended and new entrances were provided on the north side of Oxford Street and to the east of Davies Street. The Holden facade was demolished along with the Grosvenor Court Hotel that occupied the corner of Oxford Street and Davies Street, being replaced by the "West One" shopping arcade with offices above. The Jubilee line opened on 1 May 1979. In 2007, the station underwent a visual modernisation, removing the murals installed on the Central line platforms in the 1980s and replacing them with plain white tiles, in a style similar to those used when the station opened in 1900.

21st century 
The most recent expansion of the station was completed in November 2017, in preparation for the arrival of the Elizabeth line, bringing Bond Street into the National Rail network. This £300m upgrade increased the capacity of the station entrances and exits by 30 per cent, added a new entrance to the station on Marylebone Lane on the north side of Oxford Street, and installed lifts to make the station step-free. During these works in 2014, the Central line platforms closed from April to June, and the Jubilee line platforms closed from July to December.

Elizabeth line 
Between 2009 and 2022, the Crossrail project built a new Elizabeth line station at Bond Street. Originally planned to open in 2018, Bond Street did not open with the rest of the central London Elizabeth line stations in May 2022, due to tunnelling problems dating back to 2014. The various delays meant that the station was approximately £500m over budget. 

The Elizabeth line station was opened on 24 October 2022 by the mayor of London, Sadiq Khan.

Two new ticket halls were built by Crossrail at Davies Street and Hanover Square. Architects included John McAslan and Lifschutz Davidson Sandilands. Although there is no connecting corridor, the Hanover Square exit of the Bond Street Elizabeth line station is approximately 250m from Oxford Circus tube station and out-of-station interchange is permitted, allowing interchange with the Bakerloo and Victoria lines.

Services 
Services at Bond Street station are operated by London Underground (on the Central and Jubilee lines) and by the Elizabeth line.

London Underground

Central line
The typical off-peak service in trains per hour is:
 12 tph to Northolt of which 9 continue to 
 12 tph to White City of which 9 continue to 
 12 tph to Loughton of which 9 continue to Epping
 12 tph to Newbury Park of which 9 continue to Hainault

Additional services call at the station during the peak hours.

The Central line also operates a night service on Friday and Saturday nights as part of the Night Tube. Trains generally operate every 10 minutes in each direction, with trains every 20 minutes to Ealing Broadway, Loughton and Hainault via Newbury Park.

Jubilee line
The typical off-peak service in trains per hour is:
 24 tph to 
 4 tph to 
 4 tph to Willesden Green
 4 tph to Wembley Park
 12 tph to Stanmore

Additional services call at the station during the peak hours.

The Jubilee line also operates a night service on Friday and Saturday nights as part of the Night Tube. Trains generally operate every 10 minutes in each direction, between Stratford and Stanmore.

Elizabeth Line
Elizabeth line services began calling at Bond Street on 24 October 2022 and all services are operated using  EMUs.

The typical off-peak service in trains per hour is:
 8 tph to 
 8 tph to 
 8 tph to 
 2 tph to 
 2 tph to 

These services combine to give a service of 16 tph in each direction. During the peak hours, the service is increased to 20 tph in each direction.

On Sundays, the services between Shenfield and London Paddington are reduced to 4 tph.

Cultural references
The westbound Central line platform of the station is featured on the cover art for The Jam's 1978 single "Down in the Tube Station at Midnight", with the band standing at the end of the platform as a 1962 Stock train rushes into the station.

Connections
A large number of London Bus routes serve the station during the day and night.

Nearby places of interest
Bond Street
Claridge's Hotel
Handel House Museum, Brook Street
Wallace Collection, Manchester Square
Wigmore Hall, Wigmore Street

References

External links

 London Transport Museum Photographic Archive
 
 
 
 

Central line (London Underground) stations
Jubilee line stations
London Underground Night Tube stations
Tube stations in the City of Westminster
Former Central London Railway stations
Railway stations in Great Britain opened in 1900
Railway stations served by the Elizabeth line
Buildings and structures in Mayfair
Oxford Street